Schladen-Werla is a municipality in the district of Wolfenbüttel, in Lower Saxony, Germany. It was formed on 1 November 2013, when the municipalities of the former Samtgemeinde ("collective municipality") Schladen: Gielde, the town of Hornburg, Schladen proper, and Werlaburgdorf were merged.

Geography
The municipal area is located in the northern foothills of the Harz mountain range, stretching along the Oker river. It borders on the Lower Saxon district of Goslar in the southwest and on the state of Saxony-Anhalt (at the former inner German border) in the southeast.

The Schladen-Werla municipality comprises the localities of Beuchte, Gielde, Hornburg, Isingerode, Schladen, and Werlaburgdorf. The administrative seat is at Schladen.

Politics
Seats in the municipal assembly (Gemeinderat) as of 2016 local elections:
Social Democratic Party of Germany (SPD): 12
Christian Democratic Union of Germany (CDU): 7
Alliance 90/The Greens: 2
Free Voters: 1

Transport
Schladen station is a stop on the Brunswick–Bad Harzburg railway line, served by regional trains. The municipality has access to the Bundesautobahn 395 motorway from Brunswick to Goslar-Vienenburg at the Schladen-Nord and Schladen-Süd junctions.

See also
Royal palace of Werla

References

External links

Municipal website 

Wolfenbüttel (district)
Populated places established in 2013